Brekete Family is a reality radio and television program focused on human rights. It airs on radio and cable television, and streams online through social media platforms and Human Rights Radio 101.1 in Abuja, Nigeria.  The program is focused on protecting the rights of the downtrodden, helping to provide justice for the voiceless, and stimulating Nigerians to care for the oppressed.

History and background
Brekete Family was founded by Ahmed Isah. The program first aired on Kiss FM Abuja in 2009, and then later on Crowther Love FM. Following its initial success, the program's headquarters, Human Rights Radio Abuja, was established.  Brekete Family is known by Nigerians for seeking justice for the helpless.  Beneficiaries of the broadcast have praised Brekete Family for empowering people in various ways, which include securing financial assistance. The program has blossomed into several other areas such as the Brekete Academy,  where certified instructors offer courses in professional development in various fields.

The program is listened to, by millions of ordinary Nigerians, government officials, politicians, law enforcement, and even foreigners. It is a place where people obtain public redress, facilitate arbitration, and has been used to raise funds for scholarship program for the poor, sick, or hungry.

The program is conducted in Pidgin English and features real-life issues and events concerning human rights.  It has gained a wide acceptance and mass appeal, especially due to its nature of operation, similar to a community network. Hence, they reach out to the underprivileged, and intervene on behalf of the victims of daily human rights abuse.

In 2017, Brekete Family commissioned Human Rights Radio 101.1FM Abuja, the only human rights radio station in its entirety.  The radio station, equipped with the 21st-century radio facilities, has attracted many government officials, international bodies, and even the poor masses.

On 29 October 2018, the vice president of Nigeria, Professor Yemi Osibanjo was on the live show of Brekete Family, making it the first reality radio show in Nigeria to feature her vice president.

Vision
Located in Abuja, the Brekete Family Reality Radio and TV Talk Magazine is a non-profit organization that produces a live, daily program. Using investigation, dialogue, mediation, and advocacy, it helps Nigerians, especially low income population, to demand accountability and compensation for abuses. This organization supports Brekete's weekly program on electricity and education, which allow citizens to report corruption and seek redress. The project is expected to contribute to a reduction in corruption, especially retail corruption, and increase citizen participation in the new administration’s anti-corruption program.  The Brekete Family vision portrays a free and better humanity for everyone, especially the oppressed and less privileged in the society.

Mission
The mission of Brekete Family is to advocate for the rights of the oppressed and ordinary citizens in Nigeria. The motto of the program is "voice for the voiceless."

Engagement
Brekete Family Radio is aired in Abuja, Nigeria and reaches five states in Nigeria. In 2014, it has an estimated daily listenership and viewership of 20 million people across the globe.  Brekete Family was awarded $300,000 in 2016, including a grant in Nigeria.

Mediation
Brekete Family has resolved many complicated societal matters. This include broken marriages, families, warring societal groups and conflict between individual Nigerian citizens/organizations,  federal, state, and local governments and their agencies.

Investigation
Brekete Family is known for its deep investigation in cases of interest, such as serious crimes, human rights abuse, or corporate wrongdoing, in order to discover the truth and provide justice for the victims.

Partnership
 Open Society Initiative for West Africa (OSIWA)
 MacArthur Foundation

References

External links
 

Human trafficking in Nigeria
Organizatons
Non-profit organizations based in Nigeria
Human rights organizations based in Nigeria
Youth organizations based in Nigeria